Captain John Stuart Hepburn (1803–1860) was an early pastoralist and landholder in Victoria, Australia.

Hepburn was born in Scotland in 1803. He initially became a seafaring man and progressed to become master of a 226-ton brig, Alice.

In 1835, the Alice sailed for Hobart. On board was John Gardiner, an ex banker, who talked Hepburn into joining him in a pastoral run. Hepburn joined Gardiner and Joseph Hawdon in a venture to overland cattle to Port Phillip. The overlanding trip was successful. Hepburn met up with Captain John Coghill and his brother William. The brothers were settled at Kirkham and Stathellen near Braidwood, New South Wales.

In 1837, Hepburn and William Coghill became partners in a plan to overland 1400 ewes, 50 rams and 200 wethers to central Victoria.  On 15 January 1838, the party left Strathallen for Victoria. Shortly after leaving Gundagai, New South Wales, they met William Bowman and the three parties travelled southward, crossing the Murray River near Albury. The Major's (Major Mitchell) tracks were picked up near Wangaratta and followed to Mount Alexander, where they set up a lambing camp in April. Bowman stayed, establishing the Sutton Grange run, but leaving it for Jas Orr when he moved on to Stratford near Heathcote.

Smeaton Hill Run

Hepburn had hoped to settle on the country he had passed through in 1836 but found it was all taken.

From Mount Alexander, Hepburn sited Mount Kooroocheang, and the Major's Mammaloid Hills. The party moved on to establish the Smeaton Hill Run on 15 April 1838. William Coghill travelled further west, crossing Bullarook Creek and establishing Glendaruel and then Glendonald. Captain Hepburn named Smeaton Hill station after a small hamlet which lay near his birthplace. The homestead which he named Smeaton House, was constructed in 1849-50 and is occupied today. Hepburn founded the rural town of Smeaton and the town of Hepburn Springs is named after him.
John Hepburn died in 1860 aged 57 and he was buried with other members of his family in a small cemetery on the property. Smeaton House was purchased by the Righetti family and is sometimes open to the public.

References

1803 births
1860 deaths
History of Victoria (Australia)
Settlers of Australia
Scottish emigrants to colonial Australia